Jiří Suchý (born January 3, 1988) is a Czech professional ice hockey defenceman. He played with HC Vítkovice in the Czech Extraliga during the 2010–11 Czech Extraliga season.

References

External links

1988 births
Czech ice hockey defencemen
HC Vítkovice players
Living people
People from Bruntál
Sportspeople from the Moravian-Silesian Region
Czech expatriate ice hockey players in Slovakia
Czech expatriate ice hockey players in Germany
Czech expatriate ice hockey players in the United States